"Into That Good Night" is the season 9 finale of Roseanne and was the original show's series finale until a revived tenth season premiered in 2018. The episode aired on May 20, 1997 on ABC.

After a panned season, this episode undid all the plot progressions since the Conners winning the lottery by claiming it was all a fictionalization. This polarized many critics, and it remains one of the most controversial finales of all time, even after the revival season which effectively reversed all of the ill-received aspects.

The title refers to the poem "Do not go gentle into that good night" by Dylan Thomas.

Plot
The beginning of season nine saw the Conners win the lottery, which changed the dynamic of the show by increasing their socio-economic level. This finale "ripped out the rug from under viewers" by showing that the entire plot of the ninth season was in fact a dream that Roseanne Conner had concocted in her new career as a writer.

Critical reception
Time listed it in its article That Was It?: 10 Controversial TV Series Finales, describing it as "off-the-rails loopy", and compared the finale to Barr's career at that point: "by becoming rich and famous, she’d turned into an unbearable diva who’d forgotten the little people". Uproxx wrote that it "almost made up for all the nonsense before it." The A.V. Club stated that the episode "makes either excuses or amends for the season that preceded it". The Independent thought that the "middling" finale did not do justice to the show, writing "This was less a farewell than a Viking funeral, and it was worth trying to remember, even as you stared in slack-jawed astonishment at the burning boats, how much the series had deserved a good send-off."

References

1997 American television episodes
American television series finales
Roseanne episodes
Dylan Thomas